Sir Nigel Hubert Bowen, AC, KBE, QC (26 May 191127 September 1994) was an Australian lawyer, politician and judge. He was a member of the Liberal Party and served in the House of Representatives from 1964 to 1973, representing the New South Wales seat of Parramatta. He held senior ministerial office in multiple Coalition governments, serving as Attorney-General (1966–1969, 1971), Minister for Education and Science (1969–1971), and Minister for Foreign Affairs (1971–1972). After the Coalition lost the 1972 election he was an unsuccessful candidate to replace William McMahon as Liberal leader, losing to Billy Snedden by a single vote. After leaving politics he served as the inaugural chief justice of the Federal Court of Australia (1976–1990).

Early life
Bowen was born in a log cabin in Summerland, British Columbia, Canada, of Welsh and English parents.  He came to Australia as a boy and was educated for two years in England and later at The King's School in Parramatta.  He studied law at the University of Sydney as a resident of St. Paul's College, and then practised as a solicitor. He was admitted as a barrister in New South Wales in 1936 and later in Victoria.

During World War II, he volunteered in 1941 and joined the 2nd Australian Imperial Force in 1942 and served in the South Pacific theatre for two years.

Legal career
After the war, Bowen resumed his legal career, sharing chambers with Gough Whitlam, John Kerr and later Bob Ellicott.  He took silk in 1953 in New South Wales and Victoria in 1954. He was president of the New South Wales bar council from 1959 to 1961 and was vice-president of the Law Council of Australia from 1957 to 1960.  From 1946 to 1961, he was the editor of the Australian Law Journal.

Political career

Bowen was elected to parliament at the 1964 Parramatta by-election, caused by the resignation of Sir Garfield Barwick to take up an appointment as Chief Justice of Australia. He was appointed Attorney-General of Australia in the Second Holt Ministry in December 1966, and in 1968 he introduced a bill for the establishment of a federal court junior to the High Court of Australia.  Although that bill was withdrawn, it provided the basis of the Federal Court of Australia Act 1976.  Bowen appointed the Commonwealth Administrative Review Committee, which reported in 1971 and formed the basis for the establishment of the Administrative Appeals Tribunal, the appointment of a Commonwealth Ombudsman and the enactment of the Administrative Decisions (Judicial Review) Act 1977.  He also introduced the Privy Council (Limitation of Appeals) Act 1968, which began the process of abolishing appeals from the High Court to the Privy Council in London, culminating in the Australia Act 1986.

In November 1969, Bowen was appointed Minister for Education and Science in the Second Gorton Ministry.  In the McMahon Ministry, he was Attorney-General from March to August 1971 and then Minister for Foreign Affairs until the election of the Whitlam Government in 1972. Bowen was William McMahon's preferred candidate to replace William Owen on the High Court, but Anthony Mason was eventually chosen as it was feared that the Liberal Party would not be able to retain Bowen's seat at a by-election. When McMahon resigned after the 1972 election, Bowen lost the resulting leadership vote by one vote to Billy Snedden, on the fifth ballot.

Judicial career
In 1973, Bowen was appointed as Chief Judge in Equity in the Supreme Court of New South Wales. He was appointed first Chief Judge (later Chief Justice) of the Federal Court of Australia in 1976 and held this until his retirement in 1990. Bowen was one of only six politicians to have served in both the Parliament of Australia and the Federal Court of Australia, alongside Bob Ellicott, Merv Everett, Tony Whitlam, John Reeves and Duncan Kerr.

Personal life
Bowen died in Melbourne on 27 September 1994, aged 83. He was granted a state funeral. He was married twice and had three daughters from his first marriage.

Honours

Bowen was appointed a Knight Commander of the Order of the British Empire in 1976 and a Companion of the Order of Australia in 1988.

The Nigel Bowen Commonwealth Law Courts Building in Canberra was named in Bowen's honour.

References

 

Liberal Party of Australia members of the Parliament of Australia
Members of the Australian House of Representatives for Parramatta
Members of the Australian House of Representatives
Chief Justices of the Federal Court of Australia
Judges of the Federal Court of Australia
Judges of the Supreme Court of New South Wales
1911 births
1994 deaths
Companions of the Order of Australia
Australian Knights Commander of the Order of the British Empire
Australian politicians awarded knighthoods
Australian ministers for Foreign Affairs
Members of the Cabinet of Australia
University of Sydney alumni
20th-century Australian politicians
Canadian emigrants to Australia
People from Summerland, British Columbia
Government ministers of Australia
Australian Army personnel of World War II